Healer may refer to:

Conventional medicine 
Doctor of Medicine
Health professional

Alternative medicine
 Faith healer
 Folk healer
 Healer (alternative medicine), someone who purports to aid recovery from ill health
 Spiritual healer

Film and television 
 The Healer (1935 film), an American film by Reginald Barker
 The Healers (film), a 1974 American TV film featuring Lance Kerwin
 "Healer" (The Twilight Zone), a 1985 episode of The New Twilight Zone
 Healer (film), a 1994 American film starring Tyrone Power, Jr
 The Healer, a 1994 British TV film starring Paul Rhys
 "The Healer" (Law & Order: Criminal Intent), a 2006 episode of Law & Order: Criminal Intent
 Healer (TV series), a 2014 South Korean television series
 The Healer (2016 film), a comedy-drama film starring Oliver Jackson-Cohen, Jonathan Pryce, Camilla Luddington
 The Healers (audio drama), an audio drama based on Doctor Who

Music 
 The Healers (album), a 1987 album by David Murray
 The Healer (album), a 1989 album by John Lee Hooker
 Johnny Marr and the Healers, who released an album in 2003
 The Healer, a 2008 song from the album New Amerykah Part One (4th World War) by Erykah Badu
 Healer / Across the Shields, a 2009 EP by Torche
The Healer (Jenkins), a 2014 cantata by Karl Jenkins
Healer (Alex Cuba album), a 2015 album by Alex Cuba
 Healer, a 2022 album by Casting Crowns

Other uses 
 Healer (comics), a mutant in the Marvel Comics Universe
 Healer (Dungeons & Dragons), a character class in Dungeons & Dragons
 Healer (gaming), a character type in video games
 The Healer, a novel by Michael Blumlein
 The Healer, a novel by Frank G. Slaughter
 Healer (role variant), a role variant of the Keirsey Temperament Sorter
 Healer, a science fiction novel by F. Paul Wilson
 Jason (given name), Greek derived name, literally meaning "healer".

See also
 Heal (disambiguation)
 Healing (disambiguation)
 List of esoteric healing articles